Sri Ram Snehi Bhaskar is a monthly magazine based in Shahpura, Bhilwara, India. It aims to popularise the teachings of Swami Ram Charan, the founder of Ramsnehi Sampradaya. Ram Kishor Ji Maharaj of Ramsnehi Sampradaya was the founder of the magazine.

Further Information
The Office of the Registrar of Newspapers for India notes the following details, retrievable using R.N.I Number = 56167:

See also 
 Ram Charan Maharaj
 Ram Kishor Ji Maharaj
 Shree Ram Dayal Ji Maharaj
 Ramdwara

References

Magazines about spirituality
Hindu magazines
Monthly magazines published in India
Hindi-language magazines
Magazines with year of establishment missing